Jeffrey Dennis Meyer (born June 21, 1954) is an American college basketball coach, most recently an assistant at Butler University.  He was brought on in June 2017 as assistant coach by new head coach and former Michigan assistant LaVall Jordan. He previously served as a men's basketball assistant coach at Michigan under John Beilein and Indiana University during the Kelvin Sampson tenure.

He graduated in 1976 from Taylor University and played basketball with the Trojans while he was there.

Previously, he served as head coach at Liberty University where he remains the winningest coach in school history.  He was named head coach of the then Liberty Baptist College on March 25, 1981.  He stepped down as head coach to become assistant to the president of Liberty on November 1, 1997.

On November 3, 2020, Meyer announced his retirement from coaching.

Head coaching record

References

1954 births
Living people
American men's basketball coaches
American men's basketball players
Basketball coaches from Indiana
Basketball players from Indiana
Butler Bulldogs men's basketball coaches
College men's basketball head coaches in the United States
Indiana Hoosiers men's basketball coaches
Liberty Flames basketball coaches
Missouri Tigers men's basketball coaches
Purdue Boilermakers men's basketball coaches
South Florida Bulls men's basketball coaches
Taylor Trojans men's basketball players